Verna Natural Mineral Water is a brand of bottled water from the Twellium Industrial Company, produced and marketed primarily in Ghana, and considered by reviewers to be among the top selling bottled water brands in Ghana.

Production and distribution 
Verna Natural Mineral Water is produced from protected underground water and bottled by the Twellium Industrial Company headquartered in Medie Kotoku in the Eastern Region of Ghana.  While marketing is focused on Ghana, Verna Natural Mineral Water is also sold in Burkina Faso and Togo.

Rebranding 
Verna Natural Mineral Water appeared on the market in 2014. In 2017, Verna Natural Mineral Water underwent a rebranding exercise in line with market trends; focusing on its style and appeal to the younger generation. The plastic bottle containers now involved the display of blue and pink colors on its paper labeling, a pronounced logo for the product, and a yoghurt-pink colored cap. The rebranding of Verna Natural Mineral Water also reflected a logo of the "Changing Lives" social action project associated with the brand. In June 2019, Verna Natural Mineral Water won the product of the year award in at the third edition of Ghana Manufacturing Awards.

Changing lives 
Verna Natural Mineral Water offers a poverty intervention program dubbed Changing Lives, as part of its corporate social responsibility to support the underprivileged and vulnerable members of society. Changing Lives is organised around a television series made up of different episodes, where each episode tells a different story of a successful intervention project the company has carried out. Beneficiaries of Changing Lives have included autistic patients who have received mentorship support from role models to enable them build a career.

In 2017, Changing Lives was extended to Kumasi in the Ashanti Region of Ghana. At its lunch, Otumfuo Osei Tutu II endorsed and extended his support for the initiative.

References

Mineral water
Bottled water brands
Ghanaian brands